Santiago Suchilquitongo is a town and municipality in Oaxaca in south-western Mexico. The municipality covers an area of 44.65 km². 
It is part of the Etla District in the Valles Centrales region.
As of 2005, the municipality had a total population of 8,518.

See also
Suchilquitongo (archaeological site)
San Pablo Huitzo

References

Municipalities of Oaxaca